Celtis ehrenbergiana, called the desert hackberry or spiny hackberry, is a plant species that has long been called C. pallida by many authors, including in the "Flora of North America" database. It is native to Arizona, Florida, New Mexico and Texas, and to Latin America as far south as central Argentina. It grows in dry locations such as deserts, brushlands, canyons, mesas and grasslands.

Celtis ehrenbergiana is the only US species of the genus with thorns. In the US, it is a shrub or small tree up to 3 m (10 feet) tall, with thorns on the branches, although it can grow taller in the tropics. Leaves are small for the genus, less than 3 cm (1.2 inches) long and 2 cm (0.8 inches) wide. Flowers are born in cymes of 3–5 flowers. Drupes are orange, yellow or red, juicy, egg-shaped, about 7 mm in diameter, and edible by humans and wildlife.

References

Flora of Central America
Flora of Arizona
Flora of South America
Flora of Florida
Flora of Mexico
Flora of New Mexico
Flora of Texas
ehrenbergiana